Adolfo Esteban Elizaincín Eichenberger (born 9 December 1944 in Montevideo) is a Uruguayan scholar and linguist.

Publications 
 Atlas lingüístico diatópico y diastrático del Uruguay (ADDU), Vol. 1 (with Harald Thun). Kiel: Westensee Verlag, 2000
 El español en la Banda Oriental en el siglo XVIII (with Marisa Malcuori and Virginia Bertolotti). Montevideo: Facultad de Humanidades y Ciencias de la Educación, 1997
 Sociolinguistics in Argentina, Paraguay and Uruguay (ed.). Berlin: Mouton/De Gruyter, 1996
 Análisis del discurso. V Jornadas Interdisciplinarias de Lingüística. Montevideo 1987 (Comp., with Irene Madfes). Montevideo: Facultad de Humanidades y Ciencias de la Educación, 1994
 El español de América. Cuadernos bibliográficos. Argentina. Paraguay. Uruguay (with Nélida Esther Donni de Mirande, Germán de Granda Gutiérrez, Magdalena Coll). Madrid: Arco Libros, 1994
 Dialectos en contacto. Español y portugués en España y América. Montevideo: Arca, 1992
 Nos Falemo brasilero. Dialectos portugueses en Uruguay (with Luis Ernesto Behares and Graciela Barrios). Montevideo: Amesur, 1987
 Temas de Psico- y Sociolingüística (with Luis Ernesto Behares). Montevideo: Facultad de Humanidades y Ciencias, 1981
 Estudios sobre el español del Uruguay. I. Montevideo: Universidad de la República, 1981
 Bilingüismo en la Cuenca del Plata. Montevideo: OEA/OAS, 1975.

References

External links
 CV of Dr. Adolfo Elizaincín 

1947 births
University of the Republic (Uruguay) alumni
University of Puerto Rico alumni
University of Tübingen alumni
Linguists from Uruguay
Psycholinguists
Sociolinguists
Living people
Members of the Uruguayan Academy of Language